"Oso O Kosmos Tha Ehi Esena" is a song by Greek singer Demy featuring Mike. It was released as a digital download in Greece on 7 July 2014 as the third single from her second studio album Rodino Oneiro (2014). The song peaked at number 1 on the Greek Singles Chart.

Music video
A music video to accompany the release of "Oso O Kosmos Tha Ehi Esena" was first released onto YouTube on 13 May 2014 at a total length of three minutes and twenty-seven seconds.

Track listing

Charts

Release history

References

2014 songs
2014 singles